New York Nationals were a New York soccer team which played a single season in 1984 with the  United Soccer League. An earlier team also called the New York Nationals played in the American Soccer League during the 1920s.

History
In 1984, four teams from the recently folded American Soccer League joined with five other teams to form the United Soccer League.  The league was created using the principles of fiscal austerity and regional competition in order to avoid the fate of the ASL and the North American Soccer League which was in the process of collapsing.  The team signed several top ASL players and nearly signed U.S. national team midfielder Rick Davis but was unable to do so because of his high salary.  The Nationals finished 10-14 and failed to make the playoffs.  It also suffered significant financial problems and folded at the end of the season.

Year-by-year

Former players

References

United Soccer League (1984–85) teams
Nationals
Defunct soccer clubs in New York (state)
1984 establishments in New York (state)
1984 disestablishments in New York (state)
Association football clubs established in 1984
Association football clubs disestablished in 1984